The 1986 Wightman Cup was the 58th edition of the annual women's team tennis competition between the United States and Great Britain. It was held at the Royal Albert Hall in London in England in the United Kingdom.

References

1986
1986 in tennis
1986 in women's tennis
1986 in American tennis
1986 in English women's sport
1986 sports events in London
1986 in English tennis